Survivor Québec 2023 is the first season of the Québécois reality television series of Survivor Québec. This season consists of 20 Québécois competing in two tribes of ten competing against one another to survive and avoid elimination. After 44 days, one will be crowned the Sole Survivor and win the grand prize of $100,000.  The season is presented by Patrice Bélanger and airs on Noovo. The season premieres on 2 April 2023.

Contestants

Challenges

Voting History

Notes

References

External links

2020s Canadian reality television series
2023 Canadian television seasons
Québec